Vivian Vanderpuss is the stage name of Mackenzie Lemire, a Canadian drag performer most known for competing on the third season of Canada's Drag Race, winning the title of Miss Congeniality.

Early life
Lemire is originally from Kingsville, Ontario and now resides in Victoria, British Columbia.

Career
She was featured in the docu-series Canada's a Drag.

Personal life
Lemire uses the pronouns he/him out of drag and she/her in drag.

Filmography

References

Year of birth missing (living people)
Living people
21st-century Canadian LGBT people
Canada's Drag Race contestants
Canadian drag queens
People from Essex County, Ontario
People from Victoria, British Columbia